In geometry, the Cramer–Castillon problem is a problem stated by the Swiss mathematician Gabriel Cramer solved by the Italian mathematician, resident in Berlin, Jean de Castillon in 1776.

The problem consists of (see the image):

Centuries before, Pappus of Alexandria had solved a special case: when the three points are collinear. But the general case had the reputation of being very difficult.

After the geometrical construction of Castillon, Lagrange found an analytic solution, easier than Castillon's. In the beginning of the 19th century, Lazare Carnot generalized it to  points.

References

Bibliography

External links

Geometry